Mann & Machine is an American science fiction/police drama television series that aired for nine episodes on NBC from April 5 to July 14, 1992.

Synopsis
Created by Dick Wolf and Robert De Laurentis, the series starred Yancy Butler as Sgt. Eve Edison, a beautiful police officer who is also a sophisticated gynoid capable of learning and emotion. She is partnered with Det. Bobby Mann (David Andrews), a human officer who disdains robots. Rounding out the regular cast was S. Epatha Merkerson as Capt. Claghorn, Mann and Edison's superior officer.

The series focused on Mann and Edison's criminal investigations in Los Angeles twenty years in the future. An ongoing subplot of the series focused on Eve's continuing education about what makes humans tick, and her ever-growing capacity for emotion, highlighted by the penultimate episode "Billion Dollar Baby" in which Eve is placed in charge of caring for an infant, activating unexpected maternal feelings.

Although Butler received good reviews for her performance in one of her first major roles, the series was criticized heavily, with many comparing it to a failed 1970s comedy series with a similar premise, Holmes & Yoyo. The series was pulled from NBC's schedule after only four episodes. The remaining five were aired in a burnoff as summertime filler.

Episodes

See also
 Almost Human

References

External links
 

NBC original programming
Androids in television
Television series about robots
1990s American science fiction television series
Television series set in the 21st century
Television series by Universal Television
1992 American television series debuts
1992 American television series endings
English-language television shows
Television series created by Dick Wolf
Television series by Wolf Films
Television shows set in New York City